César Armando Saldívar Robles (born September 20, 1983) is a Mexican former football defender who last played for Tepic in the Ascenso MX.

Career
Saldívar made his professional debut for Petroleros de Salamanca on September 17, 2005, against Club Tijuana, during a 0–0 tie. He would become a common fixture in the defense, and was part of the Apertura 2006 team that made a run to the finals, losing to Puebla FC in the championship.

When Salamanca changed venues to La Piedad, Saldívar was one of the many Salamanca players who relocated to Michoacán along with the team.

References

External links
 

1983 births
Living people
Mexican footballers
Association football defenders
Salamanca F.C. footballers
La Piedad footballers
Altamira F.C. players
Club Necaxa footballers
San Luis F.C. players
Dorados de Sinaloa footballers
Coras de Nayarit F.C. footballers
Venados F.C. players
Liga MX players
Ascenso MX players
People from Matamoros, Tamaulipas
Footballers from Tamaulipas